Gretzky NHL 2005 is an ice hockey video game featuring professional NHL hockey player Wayne Gretzky. It was developed by Page 44 Studios and published by Sony Computer Entertainment for PlayStation 2 and PlayStation Portable (the latter as just Gretzky NHL). Mike Emrick provides commentary for the game. The PS2 version has Wayne Gretzky on the cover in a New York Rangers uniform.

Reception 

The game received "mixed or average reviews" on both platforms according to the review aggregation website Metacritic.

References

External links 
 

2004 video games
Multiplayer and single-player video games
National Hockey League video games
Page 44 Studios games
PlayStation 2 games
PlayStation Portable games
Sony Interactive Entertainment games
Video games developed in the United States
Wayne Gretzky games